Ventilation may refer to:

 Ventilation (physiology), the movement of air between the environment and the lungs via inhalation and exhalation
 Mechanical ventilation, in medicine, using artificial methods to assist breathing
 Ventilator, a machine designed to move breathable air into and out of the lungs
 Ventilation (architecture), the process of "changing" or replacing air in any space to provide high indoor air quality
 Ventilation (firefighting), the expulsion of heat and smoke from a fire building
 Ventilation (mining), flow of air to the underground workings of a mine of sufficient volume to dilute and remove noxious gases

See also 
 Heating, ventilation, and air conditioning, the technology of indoor and vehicular environmental comfort
 Mechanical fan
 Reebok Ventilator, a shoe
 Vent (disambiguation)
 Ventilator (disambiguation)